John Oakey (1813 – 10 January 1887) was an English inventor and founder of John Oakey & Sons Ltd. a manufacturer of sandpaper and polishing materials.

Oakey was apprenticed to a piano maker where he learnt to make sandpaper by glueing sand or powdered glass onto paper. He developed a better process suitable for mass-production and set up in business at Walworth, London in 1833, before moving his business to Wellington Mill at Westminster Bridge Road. He subsequently developed many wet and dry sand and emery papers, and a range of polishing compounds including lead blacking, Wellington Knife Polish, Silversmith's Soap and Plate Powder, and furniture polishes.

Advertisements for "Oakey's Knife Polish" were a common feature on buses and trams in the early twentieth century.

He died in 1887 and was buried at West Norwood Cemetery. His business passed to his sons, Joseph and John, who took it public in 1893.

External links 
 Wellington Mill (Lambeth landmark)
 Friends of West Norwood Cemetery

1813 births
1887 deaths
Burials at West Norwood Cemetery
English inventors